Avitta fasciosa is a moth of the family Erebidae first described by Frederic Moore in 1882.

Distribution
It is found in Asia from India to Hong Kong, Japan, Taiwan, Borneo, Peninsular Malaysia and Java.

Subspecies
 Avitta fasciosa fasciosa Moore, 1882
 Avitta fasciosa gracilis Holloway - from Java and Borneo

Biology
The males of this species have a wingspan of 19–22 mm.

The larvae had been recorded on Cocculus sp. (Menispermaceae).

References

External links
"オオトウウスグロクチバ Avitta fasciosa Moore, 1882". Digital Moths of Japan. Retrieved January 19, 2019.

Catocalinae
Moths of Asia